Sioux Falls Spitfire was an American soccer team, founded in 2001. The team was a member of the United Soccer Leagues Premier Development League (PDL), the fourth tier of the American Soccer Pyramid, until 2007, when the team left the league and the franchise was terminated.

The team played its home games at McEneaney Field on the grounds of O’Gorman High School in the city of Sioux Falls, South Dakota. The team's colors were white and blue.

Year-by-year

Honors
 USL PDL Heartland Division Champions 2001

Competition history

Coaches

  Tim Grove 2005
  Daniel Ohayon 2006
  Daniel Sullivan 2007

Stadia
 McEneaney Field, Sioux Falls, South Dakota 2003–07

Average attendance
 2007: 1,158
 2006: 1,176
 2005: 1,210
 2004: 710
 2003: 1,401
 2002: 1,668
 2001: 1,616

References

 
Defunct Premier Development League teams
2001 establishments in South Dakota
2007 disestablishments in South Dakota
Association football clubs established in 2001
Association football clubs disestablished in 2007
Defunct sports teams in South Dakota